Alqu (also Romanized as Ālqū) is a village in Benajuy-ye Shomali Rural District, in the Central District of Bonab County, East Azerbaijan Province, Iran. At the 2006 census, its population was 1,710, in 359 families.

Name 
According to Vladimir Minorsky, the name of this village is derived from the Mongolian given name Alghū.

References 

Populated places in Bonab County